Secretly, Greatly is a 2013 South Korean action comedy-drama film starring Kim Soo-hyun, Park Ki-woong, and Lee Hyun-woo, who play North Korean spies who infiltrate South Korea as a village idiot, a rock musician, and a high school student, respectively. They assimilate to small-town life while awaiting their orders, until one day, due to a sudden power shift in the North, their mission turns out to be an order to commit suicide.

The film is based on the 2010 spy webtoon series Covertness by Hun, which has received over 40 million page hits. Upon its release on June 5, 2013, the film broke several box office records in South Korea: the highest single day opening for a domestic film, most tickets sold in one day for a domestic film, the biggest opening weekend, the highest-grossing webtoon-based film, and the fastest movie to reach the million, two million, three million, and four million marks in audience number. Movie pundits attribute its success to a large percentage of teen audience turnout.

Plot
A group of spies called the 5446 Corps were trained by North Korean elite special forces since their youth, ostensibly towards the lofty goal of unifying Korea. They are ambitiously dispatched to South Korea, where each disguises himself as a fool, an aspiring singer, and a high school student. Passing boring time without receiving any orders from the North, they gradually get used to life as ordinary neighbors in a small town until one day, their mundane lives are turned upside down when a "secret and great" mission is suddenly assigned to them. Due to the events of the Second Battle of Yeonpyeong, South Korea demands the names, location, and rank of 30 North Korean spies active in South Korea, promising financial aid to the North on the condition that Pyongyang turns in their spies. To prevent the elites from falling into enemy hands, the North Korean government orders dozens of active duty spies to take their own lives. Meanwhile, their North Korean army instructor Kim Tae-won crosses the border to eliminate those who refuse to follow.

Cast

Principal
Kim Soo-hyun - Lieutenant Won Ryu-hwan / Bang Dong-gu
North Korean top agent who beat out 20,000 other competitors, is fluent in five languages and has an uncanny ability to read people. Disguised as a village idiot.
Park Ki-woong - Rhee Hae-rang / Kim Min-su 
Son of a high ranking North Korean official Rhee Moo-Hyuk, and as an agent is almost as good as Ryu-hwan. Disguised as a singer-wannabe.
Lee Hyun-woo - Rhee Hae-jin 
The youngest secret agent in North Korean history. Disguised as a high school student.

Supporting
Son Hyun-joo - Colonel Kim Tae-won, 5446 Corps training chief
Park Hye-sook - Jeon Soon-im, "Market granny"
Kim Sung-kyun - Seo Soo-hyuk, NIS team leader
Go Chang-seok - 2nd Lieutenant Seo Sang-gu / Professor Seo Young-guk
Jang Gwang - Go Hwi-sun, "Old man Go"
Shin Jung-geun - Mr. Park, the barber
Hong Kyung-in - Jo Doo-seok, Soon-im's son
Lee Chae-young - Heo Jeom-ran, nicknamed "Ran"
Park Eun-bin - Yoon Yoo-ran
Choi Woo-shik - Yoon Yoo-joo, Yoo-ran's younger brother
Joo Hyun - Rhee Moo-hyuk, 5446 Corps founder and Hae-rang's father
Goo Seung-hyun - Hwang Chi-woong 
Jo Yong-jin - Hwang Se-woong, Chi-woong's Younger brother
Lee Yeon-kyung - Chi-woong and Se-woong's mother
Kim Young-jin - Kim Hee-kwan, former MPAF head
Uhm Tae-goo - Hwang Jae-oh 
Moon Won-joo as Choi Wan-woo 
Kim Beop-rae - NIS director
Lee Min - department head
Yoon Won-seok - Deong-chi
Park Jeong-gi - strike-force team leader
Lee Jae-woo as North Korea Military Officer	
Go In-beom - Choi Jin-tak, NIS chief
Lee Bo-hyeon - NIS agent
Yook Se-jin - NIS agent
Kang Eun-tak - NIS agent
Park Jang-shik - NIS agent
Won Hyeon-jun - NIS agent
Heo Seok - NIS agent
Son Jun-young - young Ryu-hwan
Hong Tae-ui - young Hae-rang
Sung Yu-bin - young Hae-jin
Kim Do-gyun - audition judge
Park Hwi-sun

Reception
With 498,282 tickets sold on the day of its release, Secretly, Greatly recorded the highest single day opening of all time (by a domestic film) in South Korea, surpassing the record previously held by The Host, which opened with about 450,000 tickets sold in 2006. Within just 36 hours after its release, the film drew 1,011,025 viewers, becoming the fastest movie to reach the million mark in audience number, in the nation. For its second day (which coincided with Korea's Memorial Day holiday), it recorded the largest admissions total for a single day (by a domestic film) with 919,035 viewers. 72 hours after its release, the number of tickets sold for Secretly, Greatly crossed the 2 million border, making it the fastest film to do so. On its fifth day of release, the total ticket sales broke the 3 million mark, as the fastest record of all time. The film recorded the biggest opening weekend with a total of 3,491,294 viewers, beating Transformers: Dark of the Moon which opened with 3,356,316 viewers in 2011. It also became the highest-grossing webtoon-based movie in the nation, surpassing 2010 film Moss with 3,408,144 tickets sold.

On its eighth day of release, the film became the fastest movie to reach the 4 million mark in audience number, tied with The Host, Transformers: Dark of the Moon, The Thieves, and Iron Man 3. By the twelfth day, it drew 5 million viewers. In nineteen days, it became the fourth highest-grossing film of 2013 in the nation, behind Miracle in Cell No. 7 (12.32 million), Iron Man 3 (8.99 million), and The Berlin File (7.16 million), garnering over 6.96 million in audience.

International release
The film was released in multiple territories across Asia and North America.

In North America, it was the centerpiece presentation of the 12th New York Asian Film Festival held on 11 July 2013. Following its festival date, it opened in New York City and Los Angeles on 19 July before rolling out to 10-15 US cities throughout the summer. The 2nd Atlanta Korean Film Festival also screened the film along with several other South Korean films. In addition, the 17th Fantasia International Film Festival in Montreal screened the film in mid-July ahead of its 26 July Canadian release date.

In Asia, the film was first screened in Singapore starting on 18 July before opening in Taiwan on 26 July 2013. It then expanded across the region during the season with runs in Japan, Indonesia and Hong Kong, where Kim made his appearance for the local premiere in late July. Deals were also brokered with China and Thailand. The film was also screened at the 17th Puchon International Fantastic Film Festival and won the NH Nonghyup Citizen's Choice Award.

In Europe, the film was included at the Signals: How to Survive program section of the 43rd International Film Festival Rotterdam  held from 22 January to 2 February 2014.

Awards and nominations

References

External links
 

Covertness webtoon at Daum 

2013 films
2010s spy comedy-drama films
2010s action comedy-drama films
South Korean spy films
South Korean action comedy-drama films
Live-action films based on comics
Films based on South Korean webtoons
Films directed by Jang Cheol-soo
Showbox films
2013 comedy films
2013 drama films
2010s South Korean films
2010s Korean-language films